Francisco Páez may refer to:
Francisco Páez (singer), from Guatemala
Francisco Páez (swimmer) (born 1979), from Venezuela
Francisco Páez de la Cadena (born 1951), Spanish historian